Nkiru Njoku  (born 1980) is a Nigerian screenwriter, writer and video producer. She is the head writer of M-net's Tinsel, a Nigerian soap that started airing in 2008. In 2016 Njoku was the head content producer of Project Fame West Africa.

Njoku was one of the lead writers on MTV Shuga Alone Together in 2020 where she wrote and remotely directed the actors in some of the 70 nightly episodes. Njoku wrote the final episode and it was directed by the other lead writer Tunde Aladese.

See also
 List of Nigerian film producers

References

Living people
Nigerian screenwriters
Nigerian film producers
Nigerian women writers
Igbo women writers
Igbo people
1980 births